Ažulaukė is a village in Vilnius District Municipality, in Riešė Eldership.

References 
Villages in Vilnius County